Baker Run (also known as Windfall Run) is a tributary of Bowman Creek in Wyoming County, Pennsylvania, in the United States. The stream is not designated as an impaired waterbody. The surficial geology in its vicinity consists of alluvium, alluvial terrace, and Wisconsinan Till. Its watershed is designated as a High-Quality Coldwater Fishery and a Migratory Fishery.

Course
Baker Run begins on Stone Mountain in Noxen Township. It flows south-southeast down the mountain for a few tenths of a mile before turning south and continuing to flow down the mountain. After a short distance, it enters a deep valley and receives Windfall Run, its only named tributary, from the right. The stream then turns southeast for a short distance before turning south for a short distance. It then heads in an east-northeasterly direction (although it makes several turns) for a few tenths of a mile before reaching its confluence with Bowman Creek.

Tributaries

Hydrology
Baker Run is not designated as an impaired waterbody.

Geography and geology

The surficial geology in the vicinity of the lower reaches of Baker Run consists of alluvium, which contains stratified sand, silt, and gravel, and alluvial terrace. Further upstream, in the middle and upper reaches, there is a till known as Wisconsinan Till, which is underlain by glacial lake clays in the vicinity of the stream's middle reaches.

Watershed
The mouth of the stream is in the United States Geological Survey quadrangle of Nxoen. However, its source is in the quadrangle of Dutch Mountain.

History
Baker Run was entered into the Geographic Names Information System on August 2, 1979. Its identifier in the Geographic Names Information System is 1198348. The stream is also known as Windfall Run. This variant name appears in a 1946 United States Geological Survey map.

Biology
The drainage basin of Baker Run is designated as a High-Quality Coldwater Fishery and a Migratory Fishery. Wild trout naturally reproduce in the stream from its headwaters downstream to its mouth.

See also
Sorber Run, next tributary of Bowman Creek going downstream
Broad Hollow Run, next tributary of Bowman Creek going upstream
List of rivers of Pennsylvania
List of tributaries of Bowman Creek

References

Rivers of Wyoming County, Pennsylvania
Tributaries of Bowman Creek
Rivers of Pennsylvania